Thomas Walter Grundy (1864 – 28 January 1942) was an English Labour Party politician. He was the Member of Parliament (MP) for Rother Valley.

Grundy worked as a coal miner before winning election as a checkweighman.  He became active in the Yorkshire Miners' Association, and also in the Labour Party.  He was elected to Rotherham School Board in 1893, then Rotherham Borough Council in 1900, serving as Mayor of Rotherham in 1915/16.

Grundy stood in Rother Valley at the 1918 United Kingdom general election, and held the seat until he stood down in 1935.

References 

Labour Party (UK) MPs for English constituencies
Miners' Federation of Great Britain-sponsored MPs
1864 births
1942 deaths
Place of death missing
UK MPs 1918–1922
UK MPs 1922–1923
UK MPs 1923–1924
UK MPs 1924–1929
UK MPs 1929–1931
UK MPs 1931–1935